Angelo Talia (born 10 March 2003) is an Italian football player. He plays for  club Potenza on loan from Benevento.

Club career
He was raised in the youth system of Benevento and joined their Under-19 squad for the 2020–21 season.

He made his debut for Benevento's senior squad on 14 August 2021 in a Coppa Italia victory over SPAL. He made his Serie B debut on 27 November 2021 against Reggina.

On 1 September 2022, Talia was loaned to Potenza in Serie C.

References

External links
 

2003 births
Footballers from Naples
Living people
Italian footballers
Association football midfielders
Benevento Calcio players
Potenza Calcio players
Serie B players
Serie C players